The 1972 United States House of Representatives elections in Virginia were held on November 7, 1972 to determine who will represent the Commonwealth of Virginia in the United States House of Representatives. Virginia had ten seats in the House, apportioned according to the 1970 United States Census. Representatives are elected for two-year terms.

Overview

References

See also
 United States House elections, 1972

Virginia
1972
1972 Virginia elections